In chaos theory, the correlation integral is the mean probability that the states at two different times are close:

where  is the number of considered states ,  is a threshold distance,  a norm (e.g. Euclidean norm) and  the Heaviside step function. If only a time series is available, the phase space can be reconstructed by using a time delay embedding (see Takens' theorem):

where  is the time series,  the embedding dimension and  the time delay.

The correlation integral is used to estimate the correlation dimension.

An estimator of the correlation integral is the correlation sum:

See also
Recurrence quantification analysis

References
   (LINK)

Chaos theory